Iivari is a Finnish surname and male given name, related to the name Ivar and derived from the Old Norse Ívarr.

Given name
 Iivari Kyykoski (1881–1959), Finnish gymnast
 Iivari Malmikoski (1927–2010), Finnish boxer
 nickname of Ivar Iivari Partanen (1880–1947), Finnish gymnast
 Iivari Rötkö (1893–1957), Finnish long-distance runner
 Iivari Yrjölä (1899–1985), Finnish decathlete

Surname
 Antti Iivari (born 1992), Finnish ice hockey player
 Ulpu Iivari (born 1948), Finnish politician

See also
 Otto-Iivari Meurman, Finnish architect
 Ivar

Finnish masculine given names
Finnish-language surnames